Aaron Banks (born September 3, 1997) is an American football offensive guard for the San Francisco 49ers of the National Football League (NFL). He played college football at Notre Dame and was drafted by the 49ers in the second round of the 2021 NFL Draft.

Early life and high school
Banks grew up in Alameda, California, and attended El Cerrito High School. Banks was rated a four-star recruit and committed to play college football at Notre Dame over offers from Arizona, Arizona State, Oregon, UCLA, Baylor, Florida, Michigan and Miami. Banks lettered in football and basketball all four years of high school. He is a member of 2013-14 NCS Division 3 Champion Football Team, the first in school history. His freshman year he played with UCLA standout Adarius Pickett, Arizona State standouts Jalen Harvey and DJ Calhoun, who were all seniors at the time. He was coached by Kenny Kahn, the late George Austin, and by Michael Booker.

College career
Banks did not play in any games as a true freshman, preserving his NCAA eligibility for an extra year. He played in all 13 of Notre Dame's games and started the final six as a sophomore. He started all 13 of the Fighting Irish's games as a junior. As a senior Banks again started every game for Notre Dame and was named first-team All-ACC.

Professional career

Banks was selected by the San Francisco 49ers in the second round (48th overall) of the 2021 NFL Draft. On May 13, 2021, Banks officially signed with San Francisco on a deal worth $7.07 million.

References

External links 
 Notre Dame Fighting Irish bio

1997 births
Living people
Sportspeople from Alameda, California
Players of American football from California
American football offensive guards
Notre Dame Fighting Irish football players
All-American college football players
San Francisco 49ers players